Augochlora azteca, the Aztec augochlora, is a species of sweat bee in the family Halictidae.

References

Further reading

 

Halictidae
Articles created by Qbugbot
Insects described in 1911